The 2014–15 season of the Oberliga Baden-Württemberg, the highest association football league in the state of Baden-Württemberg, was the seventh season of the league at tier five (V) of the German football league system and the 37th season overall since establishment of the league in 1978. The regular season started on 8 August 2014 and finished on 23 May 2015.

Standings 
The league featured six new clubs for the 2014–15 season with VfR Aalen II promoted from the Verbandsliga Württemberg, Freiburger FC from the Verbandsliga Südbaden and SV Kickers Pforzheim and FC Germania Friedrichstal from the Verbandsliga Baden while SSV Ulm 1846 and SC Pfullendorf had been relegated from the Regionalliga Südwest.

Top goalscorers
The top goal scorers for the season:

Promotion play-offs
Promotion play-offs will be held at the end of the season for both the Regionalliga above and the Oberliga.

To the Regionalliga
The runners-up of the Hessenliga, Oberliga Rheinland-Pfalz/Saar and the Oberliga Baden-Württemberg, TSV Lehnerz, SC Hauenstein and Bahlinger SC, played each other for one more spot in the Regionalliga. While the first game had been scheduled the second and third depended on the outcome of the first. Bahlinger SC won promotion to the Regionalliga courtesy to a win and a draw.

To the Oberliga
The runners-up of the Verbandsliga Baden, Verbandsliga Südbaden and Verbandsliga Württemberg play each other for one more spot in the Oberliga, whereby the Baden and Südbaden runners-up play each other first with the winner of this encounter then meets the Württemberg runners-up.
First round

Second round

References

External links 
 Oberliga Baden-Württemberg on Fupa.net 

Baden
Oberliga Baden-Württemberg seasons